Germany was represented by Ulla Wiesner, with the song "Paradies, wo bist du?", at the 1965 Eurovision Song Contest, which took place on 20 March in Naples, Italy. "Paradies, wo bist du?" was the winner of the German national final, held on 27 February.

Before Eurovision

Ein Lied für Neapel
The final was held at the NDR TV studios in Hamburg, hosted by Henno Lohmeyer. Six songs took part, with the winning song chosen by an 11-member jury who each awarded one point to their favourite song. "Paradies, wo bist du?" was the choice of 8 of the jurors.

At Eurovision 
On the night of the final Wiesner performed 5th in the running order, following Ireland and preceding Austria. Voting was by each national jury awarding 5-3-1 to their top 3 songs, and at the close "Paradies, wo bist du?" was one of four songs (along with the entries from Belgium, Finland and Spain) which had failed to pick up a single point. This was the fourth consecutive contest in which four countries had failed to score, and a second consecutive nul-points for Germany, their last until 2015, 50 years later. The German jury awarded its 5 points to contest winners Luxembourg.

Voting 
Germany did not receive any points at the 1965 Eurovision Song Contest.

References 

1965
Countries in the Eurovision Song Contest 1965
Eurovision